Basti Dhandlah is a town of Bahawalpur District in the Punjab province of eastern Pakistan. Neighbouring settlements include Basti Nari and Faqirwali.

Populated places in Bahawalpur District